David Khan (born May 17, 1974)  is a Canadian politician, was the leader of the Alberta Liberal Party from 2017 to 2020. Prior to running for leader, Khan served as the party's executive vice-president. He was elected leader on June 4, 2017.

Political positions
Khan does not support co-operation with the Alberta Party, but does support forging closer ties with the Liberal Party of Canada. Khan's leadership platform included a basic income pilot project, elimination of the small business tax, proportional representation for the Legislature, more free votes for MLAs, bringing private schools into the public system, and establishing universal pharmacare for those under 24.

Personal life
Born in Calgary, Khan's father was an immigrant to Canada from Pakistan while his mother is English. Professionally, Khan is a lawyer who practices indigenous law and is fluently bilingual in both English and French. He is the first openly gay leader of a major Alberta political party.

Election results
He was previously the party's 2014 by-election candidate in Calgary-West and 2015 provincial election candidate in Calgary-Buffalo, finishing third both times. Khan was also the Liberal candidate in the December 14, 2017 by-election in Calgary-Lougheed. He again placed third, behind United Conservative Party leader Jason Kenney and the NDP candidate. Under his leadership, the Alberta Liberal Party experienced its worst results in history in the 2019 provincial election.

2019 general election

2017 by-election

2015 general election

2014 by-election

References

External links
David Khan 

Living people
21st-century Canadian politicians
Alberta Liberal Party candidates in Alberta provincial elections
Gay politicians
Lawyers in Alberta
Leaders of the Alberta Liberal Party
Canadian LGBT politicians
Politicians from Calgary
Canadian politicians of Pakistani descent
Canadian people of English descent
1970s births
21st-century Canadian LGBT people
Canadian gay men